The Pete Hanna Center is the building housing the 4,974-seat Thomas E. and Marla H. Corts Arena on the campus of Samford University in Homewood (a suburb of Birmingham), in the U.S. state of Alabama.

It is home to the Samford Bulldogs basketball and volleyball teams, having replaced Seibert Hall. The facility opened in October 2007 and is named for Pete Hanna, the owner, president and chief executive officer of Hanna Steel Corporation. The arena is named for Thomas and Marla Corts, former president and first lady of Samford University.

The Pete Hanna Center opened on October 18, 2007, with a lecture by best-selling author Walter Isaacson.  The  Hanna Center seats 5,000 in Corts Arena and is the home to Samford University Commencement, as well as playing host to concerts, high school basketball, conferences and a yearly stop from the Harlem Globetrotters.  A record crowd of 5,116 watched the Samford men's basketball team take on Davidson College on January 31, 2009.  The Hanna Center also contains a workout facility for students, faculty and staff, athletics offices, locker rooms, athletic training and strength and conditioning facilities.

Most recently, the Pete Hanna Center was the host of the 2009 T-Mobile Invitational.  The prestigious national high school basketball tournament was played December 29–30, 2009 at the Hanna Center.  The Hanna Center is also the host of the yearly Birmingham stop of the World Famous Harlem Globetrotters.

See also
 List of NCAA Division I basketball arenas

References

External links
Pete Hanna Center website
Pete Hanna Center gallery

Samford Bulldogs basketball
Buildings and structures in Jefferson County, Alabama
Basketball venues in Alabama
College basketball venues in the United States
2007 establishments in Alabama
Sports venues completed in 2007
College volleyball venues in the United States